A hymn is a song written as a song of praise, adoration or prayer.

Hymn(s) may also refer to:

 "Hymn" (poem) or Cædmon's Hymn, a 7th-century Anglo-Saxon poem
 Hymn (software), a program to decrypt iTunes music files

Music
 National hymn, a musical composition recognized by a nation's government as the official national song
 Hymn: Sarah Brightman In Concert, a concert tour
 Hymns (band), an American indie rock band

Albums
 Hymn (album) or the title song, by Sarah Brightman, 2018
 Hymns (2nd Chapter of Acts album), 1986
 Hymns (Bloc Party album), 2016
 Hymns (Corey Glover album), 1998
 Hymns (Godflesh album), 2001
 Hymns (Loretta Lynn album), 1965
 Hymns (Michael W. Smith album), 2014
 Hymns (Out of Eden album), 2005
 Hymns (Tennessee Ernie Ford album), 1957
 Hymns (EP), by Anathallo, 2004
 Hymns, by Beth Nielsen Chapman, 2004
 Hymns: A Place of Worship, by 4Him, 2000

Songs
 "Hymn" (Celine Dion song), 2015
 "Hymn" (Kesha song), 2017
 "Hymn" (Moby song), 1994
 "Hymn" (Ultravox song), 1982
 "Hymn", by Barclay James Harvest from Gone to Earth, 1977
 "Hymn", by James Taylor from One Man Dog, 1972
 "Hymn", by Janis Ian from Aftertones, 1976
 "Hymn", by Patti Smith Group from Wave, 1979
 "Hymn", by Pedro the Lion from Whole, 1997
 "Hymn", by Peter Paul and Mary from Late Again, 1968
 "Hymn", by Jars of Clay from Much Afraid, 1997
 "Hymn", by Kevin Ayers from Bananamour, 1973, later covered by Ultramarine & David McAlmont

See also

Him (disambiguation)
Hymns II (disambiguation)